The Grammy Award for Best Opera Recording has been awarded since 1961. The award was originally titled Best Classical Opera Production. The current title has been used since 1962.

Prior to 1961 the awards for operatic and choral performances were combined in a single award for Best Classical Performance, Operatic or Choral.

According to the list of nominees for the 2023 Grammy season, the award goes to the conductor, album producer(s) and principal soloists, and also to the composer and librettist (if applicable) of a world premiere opera recording only.

Years reflect the year in which the Grammy Awards were presented, for works released in the previous year.

Note: Performers who did not receive a nomination and/or an award (such as orchestras, choruses, etc.) are listed between brackets.

Recipients

References

Opera Recording
Opera-related lists
 
Opera Recording